The following is a partial list of the "B" codes for Medical Subject Headings (MeSH), as defined by the United States National Library of Medicine (NLM).

This list continues the information at List of MeSH codes (B02). Codes following these are found at List of MeSH codes (B04). For other MeSH codes, see List of MeSH codes.

The source for this content is the set of 2006 MeSH Trees from the NLM.

– bacteria

– atypical bacterial forms

– l forms

– spheroplasts

– bacteria, aerobic

– bacteria, anaerobic

– Bacteroidetes

– bacteroidaceae
  – bacteroides
  – Bacteroides fragilis
  – Porphyromonas
  – Porphyromonas endodontalis
  – Porphyromonas gingivalis
  – Prevotella
  – Prevotella intermedia
  – Prevotella melaninogenica
  – Prevotella nigrescens
  – Prevotella ruminicola

– flavobacteriaceae
  – Capnocytophaga
  – Chryseobacterium
  – Flavobacterium
  – Ornithobacterium

– flexibacteraceae
  – Cytophaga
  – Flexibacter

– Rhodothermus

– Sphingobacterium

– biofilms

– blood-borne pathogens

– Chlorobiota

– Chlorobium

– Chloroflexota

– Chloroflexus

– "Cyanobacteria"

– Anabaena
  – Anabaena cylindrica
  – Anabaena flos-aquae
  – Anabaena variabilis

– Aphanizomenon

– Cyanothece

– Cylindrospermopsis

– Microcystis

– Nodularia

– Nostoc
  – Nostoc commune
  – Nostoc muscorum

– Plectonema

– Synechococcus

– Synechocystis

– endospore-forming bacteria

– gram-positive endospore-forming bacteria
  – gram-positive endospore-forming rods
  – bacillaceae
  – Bacillus
  – Bacillus anthracis
  – Bacillus cereus
  – Bacillus megaterium
  – Bacillus stearothermophilus
  – Bacillus subtilis
  – Bacillus thuringiensis
  – Clostridium
  – Clostridium acetobutylicum
  – Clostridium beijerinckii
  – Clostridium bifermentans
  – Clostridium botulinum
  – Clostridium botulinum type A
  – Clostridium botulinum type B
  – Clostridium botulinum type C
  – Clostridium botulinum type D
  – Clostridium botulinum type E
  – Clostridium botulinum type F
  – Clostridium botulinum type G
  – Clostridium butyricum
  – Clostridium cellulolyticum
  – Clostridium cellulovorans
  – Clostridium chauvoei
  – clostridium difficile
  – Clostridium histolyticum
  – Clostridium kluyveri
  – Clostridium perfringens
  – Clostridium sordellii
  – Clostridium sticklandii
  – Clostridium symbiosum
  – Clostridium tertium
  – Clostridium tetani
  – Clostridium tetanomorphum
  – Clostridium thermocellum
  – Clostridium tyrobutyricum
  – micromonosporaceae
  – Micromonospora
  – Saccharopolyspora
  – streptomycetaceae
  – Streptomyces
  – Streptomyces antibioticus
  – Streptomyces aureofaciens
  – Streptomyces coelicolor
  – Streptomyces griseus
  – Streptomyces lividans

– Fusobacteriota

– Fusobacterium
  – Fusobacterium necrophorum
  – Fusobacterium nucleatum

– Leptotrichia

– Propionigenium

– Streptobacillus

– gram-negative bacteria

– anaplasmataceae
  – Anaplasma
  – Anaplasma centrale
  – Anaplasma marginale
  – Anaplasma ovis
  – Anaplasma phagocytophilum
  – Ehrlichia
  – Ehrlichia canis
  – Ehrlichia chaffeensis
  – Ehrlichia ruminantium
  – Neorickettsia
  – Neorickettsia risticii
  – Neorickettsia sennetsu

– Arcobacter

– bartonellaceae
  – Bartonella
  – Bartonella bacilliformis
  – Bartonella henselae
  – Bartonella quintana

– Buchnera

– Campylobacter
  – Campylobacter coli
  – Campylobacter fetus
  – Campylobacter hyointestinalis
  – Campylobacter jejuni
  – Campylobacter lari
  – Campylobacter rectus
  – Campylobacter sputorum
  – Campylobacter upsaliensis

– chlamydiales
  – chlamydiaceae
  – Chlamydia
  – Chlamydia muridarum
  – Chlamydia trachomatis
  – Chlamydophila
  – Chlamydophila pneumoniae
  – Chlamydophila psittaci

– Chloroflexus

– Gastrospirillum

– gram-negative aerobic bacteria
  – Caulobacter
  – Caulobacter crescentus
  – gallionellaceae
  – gram-negative aerobic rods and cocci
  – acetobacteraceae
  – Acetobacter
  – Acidiphilium
  – Gluconobacter
  – Gluconobacter oxydans
  – Acidithiobacillus
  – Acidithiobacillus thiooxidans
  – Afipia
  – alcaligenaceae
  – Achromobacter
  – Achromobacter cycloclastes
  – Achromobacter denitrificans
  – Alcaligenes
  – Alcaligenes faecalis
  – Bordetella
  – Bordetella avium
  – Bordetella bronchiseptica
  – Bordetella parapertussis
  – Bordetella pertussis
  – Taylorella
  – Taylorella equigenitalis
  – Alteromonas
  – Azorhizobium
  – Azorhizobium caulinodans
  – azotobacteraceae
  – Azotobacter
  – Azotobacter vinelandii
  – Bdellovibrio
  – Nitrobacteraceae
  – Afipia
  – Bradyrhizobium
  – Nitrobacter
  – Rhodopseudomonas
  – Bradyrhizobium
  – brucellaceae
  – Brucella
  – Brucella abortus
  – Brucella canis
  – Brucella melitensis
  – Brucella ovis
  – Brucella suis
  – burkholderiaceae
  – Burkholderia
  – Burkholderia cepacia complex
  – Burkholderia cepacia
  – Burkholderia gladioli
  – Burkholderia mallei
  – Burkholderia pseudomallei
  – Caulobacteraceae
  – Caulobacter
  – Caulobacter crescentus
  – Cellvibrio
  – comamonadaceae
  – Comamonas
  – Comamonas testosteroni
  – Delftia
  – Delftia acidovorans
  – :eptothrix
  – Sphaerotilus
  – Coxiellaceae
  – coxiella
  – Coxiella burnetii
  – flavobacteriaceae
  – Chryseobacterium
  – Flavobacterium
  – Ornithobacterium
  – flexibacteraceae
  – Cytophaga
  – Flexibacter
  – Francisella
  – Fancisella tularensis
  – Gluconacetobacter
  – Gluconacetobacter xylinus
  – halomonadaceae
  – Halomonas
  – Halothiobacillus
  – legionellaceae
  – Legionella
  – Legionella longbeachae
  – Legionella pneumophila
  – Leptospiraceae
  – Leptospira
  – Leptospira interrogans
  – Leptospira interrogans serovar australis
  – Leptospira interrogans serovar autumnalis
  – Leptospira interrogans serovar canicola
  – Leptospira interrogans serovar hebdomadis
  – Leptospira interrogans serovar icterohaemorrhagiae
  – Leptospira interrogans serovar pomona
  – methylobacteriaceae
  – Methylobacterium
  – Methylobacterium extorquens
  – methylococcaceae
  – Methylococcus
  – Methylococcus capsulatus
  – Methylomonas
  – methylophilaceae
  – Methylobacillus
  – Methylophilus
  – Methylophilus methylotrophus
  – moraxellaceae
  – Acinetobacter
  – Acinetobacter baumannii
  – Acinetobacter calcoaceticus
  – Moraxella
  – Moraxella (Branhamella) catarrhalis
  – Moraxella (Moraxella) bovis
  – Psychrobacter
  – Neisseriaceae
  – Kingella
  – Kingella kingae
  – Neisseria
  – Neisseria cinerea
  – Neisseria elongata
  – Neisseria gonorrhoeae
  – Neisseria lactamica
  – Neisseria meningitidis
  – Neisseria meningitidis, serogroup A
  – Neisseria meningitidis, serogroup B
  – Neisseria meningitidis, serogroup X
  – Neisseria meningitidis, serogroup W-135
  – Neisseria meningitidis, serogroup Y
  – Neisseria mucosa
  – Neisseria sicca
  – nitrosomonadaceae
  – Nitrosomonas
  – Nitrosomonas europaea
  – Ochrobactrum
  – Ochrobactrum anthropi
  – oxalobacteraceae
  – Herbaspirillum
  – Paracoccus
  – Paracoccus denitrificans
  – Paracoccus pantotrophus
  – Pseudoalteromonas
  – Pseudomonadaceae
  – Pseudomonas
  – Pseudomonas aeruginosa
  – Pseudomonas alcaligenes
  – Pseudomonas fluorescens
  – Pseudomonas fragi
  – Pseudomonas mendocina
  – Pseudomonas oleovorans
  – Pseudomonas pseudoalcaligenes
  – Pseudomonas putida
  – Pseudomonas stutzeri
  – Pseudomonas syringae
  – ralstoniaceae
  – Ralstonia
  – Ralstonia pickettii
  – Ralstonia solanacearum
  – Wautersia
  – Wautersia eutropha
  – rhizobiaceae
  – Rhizobium
  – Rhizobium etli
  – Rhizobium leguminosarum
  – Rhizobium phaseoli
  – Rhizobium radiobacter
  – Rhizobium tropici
  – Sinorhizobium
  – Sinorhizobium fredii
  – Sinorhizobium meliloti
  – rhodospirillaceae
  – Azospirillum
  – Azospirillum brasilense
  – Azospirillum lipoferum
  – Magnetospirillum
  – Rhodospirillum
  – Rhodospirillum centenum
  – Rhodospirillum rubrum
  – Rhodothermus
  – Sphingobacterium
  – Sphingomonas
  – Thermus
  – Thermus thermophilus
  – Xanthobacter
  – xanthomonadaceae
  – Stenotrophomonas
  – Stenotrophomonas maltophilia
  – Xanthomonas
  – Xanthomonas campestris
  – Xanthomonas vesicatoria
  – Xylella
  – Zoogloea
  – gram-negative chemolithotrophic bacteria
  – Thiobacillus
  – Thiotrichaceae
  – Vitreoscilla

– gram-negative anaerobic bacteria
  – gram-negative anaerobic cocci
  – Megasphaera
  – Thiocapsa
  – Thiocapsa roseopersicina
  – gram-negative anaerobic straight, curved, and helical rods
  – acidaminococcaceae
  – Acidaminococcus
  – Pectinatus
  – Selenomonas
  – Veillonella
  – Anaerobiospirillum
  – bacteroidaceae
  – Bacteroides
  – Bacteroides fragilis
  – Porphyromonas
  – Porphyromonas endodontalis
  – Porphyromonas gingivalis
  – Prevotella
  – Prevotella intermedia
  – Prevotella melaninogenica
  – Prevotella nigrescens
  – Prevotella ruminicola
  – Bilophila
  – Butyrivibrio
  – Chlorobium
  – Chromatium
  – Desulfovibrio
  – Desulfovibrio africanus
  – Desulfovibrio desulfuricans
  – Desulfovibrio gigas
  – Desulfovibrio vulgaris
  – Desulfuromonas
  – Dichelobacter nodosus
  – ectothiorhodospiraceae
  – Ectothiorhodospira
  – Ectothiorhodospira shaposhnikovii
  – Halorhodospira halophila
  – Fibrobacter
  – Fusobacterium
  – Fusobacterium necrophorum
  – Fusobacterium nucleatum
  – Geobacter
  – Leptotrichia
  – Oxalobacter formigenes
  – Propionigenium
  – Selenomonas
  – Spirochaetaceae
  – Borrelia
  – Borrelia burgdorferi group
  – Borrelia burgdorferi
  – Serpulina
  – Serpulina hyodysenteriae
  – Spirochaeta
  – Treponema
  – Treponema denticola
  – Treponema pallidum
  – succinivibrionaceae
  – Thauera
  – Thermotoga maritima
  – Thermotoga neapolitana
  – Wolinella

– gram-negative facultatively anaerobic rods
  – Actinobacillus
  – Actinobacillus actinomycetemcomitans
  – Actinobacillus equuli
  – Actinobacillus pleuropneumoniae
  – Actinobacillus seminis
  – Actinobacillus suis
  – aeromonadaceae
  – Aeromonas
  – Aeromonas hydrophila
  – Aeromonas salmonicida
  – Azoarcus
  – Capnocytophaga
  – cardiobacteriaceae
  – Cardiobacterium
  – Dichelobacter nodosus
  – Chromobacterium
  – Eikenella
  – Eikenella corrodens
  – enterobacteriaceae
  – Calymmatobacterium
  – Citrobacter
  – Citrobacter freundii
  – Citrobacter koseri
  – Citrobacter rodentium
  – Edwardsiella
  – Edwardsiella ictaluri
  – Edwardsiella tarda
  – Enterobacter
  – Enterobacter aerogenes
  – Enterobacter cloacae
  – Enterobacter sakazakii
  – Erwinia
  – Erwinia amylovora
  – Escherichia
  – Escherichia coli
  – Escherichia coli k12
  – Escherichia coli o157
  – Hafnia
  – Hafnia alvei
  – Klebsiella
  – Klebsiella oxytoca
  – Klebsiella pneumoniae
  – Kluyvera
  – Morganella
  – Morganella morganii
  – Pantoea
  – Pectobacterium
  – Pectobacterium carotovorum
  – Pectobacterium chrysanthemi
  – Photorhabdus
  – Plesiomonas
  – Proteus
  – Proteus mirabilis
  – Proteus penneri
  – Proteus vulgaris
  – Providencia
  – Salmonella
  – Salmonella arizonae
  – Salmonella enterica
  – Salmonella enteritidis
  – Salmonella paratyphi A
  – Salmonella paratyphi B
  – Salmonella paratyphi C
  – Salmonella typhi
  – Salmonella typhimurium
  – Serratia
  – Serratia liquefaciens
  – Serratia marcescens
  – Shigella
  – Shigella boydii
  – Shigella dysenteriae
  – Shigella flexneri
  – Shigella sonnei
  – Wigglesworthia
  – Xenorhabdus
  – Yersinia
  – Yersinia enterocolitica
  – Yersinia pestis
  – Yersinia pseudotuberculosis
  – Yersinia rucker
  – Gardnerella
  – Gardnerella vaginalis
  – Moritella
  – Pasteurellaceae
  – Haemophilus
  – Haemophilus ducreyi
  – Haemophilus influenzae
  – Haemophilus influenzae type B
  – Haemophilus paragallinarum
  – Haemophilus parainfluenzae
  – Haemophilus paraphrophilus
  – Haemophilus parasuis
  – Haemophilus somnus
  – Mannheimia
  – Mannheimia haemolytica
  – Pasteurella
  – Pasteurella multocida
  – Pasteurella pneumotropica
  – Rahnella
  – Shewanella
  – Shewanella putrefaciens
  – Streptobacillus
  – vibrionaceae
  – Photobacterium
  – Vibrio
  – Vibrio alginolyticus
  – Vibrio cholerae
  – Vibrio cholerae non-O1
  – Vibrio cholerae O1
  – Vibrio cholerae O139
  – Vibrio fischeri
  – Vibrio mimicus
  – Vibrio parahaemolyticus
  – Vibrio salmonicida
  – Vibrio vulnificus
  – Zymomonas

– gram-negative oxygenic photosynthetic bacteria
  – cyanobacteria
  – Anabaena
  – Anabaena cylindrica
  – Anabaena flos-aquae
  – Anabaena variabilis
  – Aphanizomenon
  – Cyanothece
  – Cylindrospermopsis
  – Microcystis
  – Nodularia
  — Nostoc
  – Nostoc commune
  – Nostoc muscorum
  – Plectonema
  – Prochlorophytes
  – Prochlorococcus
  – Prochloron
  – Prochlorothrix
  – Synechococcus
  – Synechocystis

– Helicobacter
  – Helicobacter felis
  – Helicobacter heilmannii
  – Helicobacter hepaticus
  – Helicobacter mustelae
  – Helicobacter pylori

– Lawsonia bacteria

– Methylosinus
  – Methylosinus trichosporium

– mollicutes
  – acholeplasmataceae
  – Acholeplasma
  – Acholeplasma laidlawii
  – Phytoplasma
  – Entomoplasmataceae
  – Erysipelothrix
  – mycoplasmatales
  – mycoplasmataceae
  – Mycoplasma
  – Mycoplasma agalactiae
  – Mycoplasma arthritidis
  – Mycoplasma bovigenitalium
  – Mycoplasma bovis
  – Mycoplasma capricolum
  – Mycoplasma conjunctivae
  – Mycoplasma dispar
  – Mycoplasma fermentans
  – Mycoplasma gallisepticum
  – Mycoplasma genitalium
  – Mycoplasma hominis
  – Mycoplasma hyopneumoniae
  – Mycoplasma hyorhinis
  – Mycoplasma hyosynoviae
  – Mycoplasma iowae
  – Mycoplasma meleagridis
  – Mycoplasma mycoides
  – Mycoplasma orale
  – Mycoplasma ovipneumoniae
  – Mycoplasma penetrans
  – Mycoplasma pneumoniae
  – Mycoplasma pulmonis
  – Mycoplasma salivarium
  – Mycoplasma synoviae
  – Ureaplasma
  – Ureaplasma urealyticum
  – spiroplasmataceae
  – Spiroplasma
  – Spiroplasma citri

– oceanospirillaceae

– Ornithobacterium

– piscirickettsiaceae

– Rhodobacter
  – Rhodobacter capsulatus
  – Rhodobacter sphaeroides

– Rhodomicrobium

– Rhodovulum

– rickettsiaceae
  – rickettsieae
  – Orientia tsutsugamushi
  – Rickettsia
  – Rickettsia akari
  – Rickettsia conorii
  – Rickettsia felis
  – Rickettsia prowazekii
  – Rickettsia rickettsii
  – Rickettsia typhi
  – Wolbachia

– Roseobacter

– spirillaceae
  – Spirillum

– gram-positive bacteria

– Actinomycetota
  – actinomycetales
  – actinomycetaceae
  – Actinomyces
  – Actinomyces viscosus
  – Mobiluncus
  – Brevibacterium
  – Cellulomonas
  – Corynebacterium
  – Brevibacterium flavum
  – Corynebacterium diphtheriae
  – Corynebacterium glutamicum
  – Corynebacterium pseudotuberculosis
  – Corynebacterium pyogenes
  – Frankia
  – Gordonia bacterium
  – micrococcaceae
  – Arthrobacter
  – Micrococcus
  – Micrococcus luteus
  – micromonosporaceae
  – Micromonospora
  – mycobacteriaceae
  – Mycobacterium
  – mycobacteria, atypical
  – Mycobacterium avium complex
  – Mycobacterium chelonae
  – Mycobacterium fortuitum
  – Mycobacterium kansasii
  – Mycobacterium marinum
  – Mycobacterium scrofulaceum
  – Mycobacterium smegmatis
  – Mycobacterium ulcerans
  – Mycobacterium xenopi
  – Mycobacterium avium
  – Mycobacterium bovis
  – Mycobacterium haemophilum
  – Mycobacterium leprae
  – Mycobacterium lepraemurium
  – Mycobacterium paratuberculosis
  – Mycobacterium phlei
  – Mycobacterium tuberculosis
  – nocardiaceae
  – Nocardia
  – Nocardia asteroides
  – Rhodococcus
  – Rhodococcus equi
  – propionibacteriaceae
  – Propionibacterium
  – Propionibacterium acnes
  – Saccharopolyspora
  – Streptomycetaceae
  – Streptomyces
  – Streptomyces antibioticus
  – Streptomyces aureofaciens
  – Streptomyces coelicolor
  – Streptomyces griseus
  – Streptomyces lividans
  – Bifidobacterium
  – Gardnerella
  – Gardnerella vaginalis

– gram-positive cocci
  – Deinococcus
  – micrococcaceae
  – Micrococcus
  – Micrococcus luteus
  – peptococcaceae
  – Peptococcus
  – Peptostreptococcus
  – Ruminococcus
  – Sarcina
  – staphylococcaceae
  – Staphylococcus
  – Staphylococcus aureus
  – Staphylococcus epidermidis
  – Staphylococcus haemolyticus
  – Staphylococcus hominis
  – streptococcaceae
  – Enterococcus
  – Enterococcus faecalis
  – Enterococcus faecium
  – Lactococcus
  – Lactococcus lactis
  – Leuconostoc
  – Pediococcus
  – Streptococcus
  – Streptococcus agalactiae
  – Streptococcus bovis
  – Streptococcus equi
  – Streptococcus pneumoniae
  – Streptococcus pyogenes
  – Streptococcus suis
  – Streptococcus thermophilus
  – Viridans streptococci
  – Streptococcus milleri group
  – Streptococcus anginosus
  – Streptococcus constellatus
  – Streptococcus intermedius
  – Streptococcus mitis
  – Streptococcus mutans
  – Streptococcus oralis
  – Streptococcus sanguis
  – Streptococcus sobrinus

– gram-positive endospore-forming bacteria
  – gram-positive endospore-forming rods
  – bacillaceae
  – Bacillus
  – Bacillus anthracis
  – Bacillus cereus
  – Bacillus megaterium
  – Bacillus stearothermophilus
  – Bacillus subtilis
  – Bacillus thuringiensis
  – Clostridium
  – Clostridium acetobutylicum
  – Clostridium beijerinckii
  – Clostridium bifermentans
  – Clostridium botulinum
  – Clostridium botulinum type A
  – Clostridium botulinum type B
  – Clostridium botulinum type C
  – Clostridium botulinum type D
  – Clostridium botulinum type E
  – Clostridium botulinum type F
  – Clostridium botulinum type G
  – Clostridium butyricum
  – Clostridium cellulolyticum
  – Clostridium cellulovorans
  – Clostridium chauvoei
  – Clostridium difficile
  – Clostridium histolyticum
  – Clostridium kluyveri
  – Clostridium perfringens
  – Clostridium sordellii
  – Clostridium sticklandii
  – Clostridium symbiosum
  – Clostridium tertium
  – Clostridium tetani
  – Clostridium tetanomorphum
  – Clostridium thermocellum
  – Clostridium tyrobutyricum
  – desulfotomaculum
  – micromonosporaceae
  – Micromonospora
  – Saccharopolyspora
  – streptomycetaceae
  – Streptomyces
  – Streptomyces antibioticus
  – Streptomyces aureofaciens
  – Streptomyces coelicolor
  – Streptomyces griseus
  – Streptomyces lividans

– gram-positive rods
  – gram-positive asporogenous rods
  – gram-positive asporogenous rods, irregular
  – Acetobacterium
  – Actinomycetota
  – actinomycetaceae
  – Actinomyces
  – Actinomyces viscosus
  – Mobiluncus
  – Arthrobacter
  – Bifidobacterium
  – Brevibacterium
  – Butyrivibrio
  – Corynebacterium
  – Corynebacterium diphtheriae
  – Corynebacterium glutamicum
  – Corynebacterium pseudotuberculosis
  – Corynebacterium pyogenes
  – Eubacterium
  – propionibacteriaceae
  – Propionibacterium
  – Propionibacterium acnes
  – Thermoanaerobacter
  – Thermoanaerobacterium
  – gram-positive asporogenous rods, regular
  – Erysipelothrix
  – lactobacillaceae
  – Lactobacillus
  – Lactobacillus acidophilus
  – Lactobacillus brevis
  – Lactobacillus casei
  – Lactobacillus delbrueckii
  – Lactobacillus fermentum
  – Lactobacillus helveticus
  – Lactobacillus leichmannii
  – Lactobacillus plantarum
  – Lactobacillus reuteri
  – Lactobacillus rhamnosus
  – Listeria
  – Listeria monocytogenes
  – mycobacteriaceae
  – Mycobacterium
  – mycobacteria, atypical
  – Mycobacterium avium complex
  – Mycobacterium chelonae
  – Mycobacterium fortuitum
  – Mycobacterium kansasii
  – Mycobacterium marinum
  – Mycobacterium scrofulaceum
  – Mycobacterium smegmatis
  – Mycobacterium ulcerans
  – Mycobacterium xenopi
  – Mycobacterium avium
  – Mycobacterium bovis
  – Mycobacterium haemophilum
  – Mycobacterium leprae
  – Mycobacterium lepraemurium
  – Mycobacterium paratuberculosis
  – Mycobacterium phlei
  – Mycobacterium tuberculosis
  – gram-positive endospore-forming rods
  – bacillaceae
  – Bacillus
  – Bacillus anthracis
  – Bacillus cereus
  – Bacillus megaterium
  – Bacillus stearothermophilus
  – Bacillus subtilis
  – Bacillus thuringiensis
  – micromonosporaceae
  – Micromonospora
  – Saccharopolyspora
  – streptomycetaceae
  – Streptomyces
  – Streptomyces antibioticus
  – Streptomyces aureofaciens
  – Streptomyces coelicolor
  – Streptomyces griseus
  – Streptomyces lividans

– Pseudomonadota

– Alphaproteobacteria
  – anaplasmataceae
  – Anaplasma
  – Anaplasma centrale
  – Anaplasma marginale
  – Anaplasma ovis
  – Anaplasma phagocytophilum
  – Ehrlichia
  – Ehrlichia canis
  – Ehrlichia chaffeensis
  – Ehrlichia ruminantium
  – Neorickettsia
  – Neorickettsia risticii
  – Neorickettsia sennetsu
  – bartonellaceae
  – Bartonella
  – Bartonella bacilliformis
  – Bartonella henselae
  – Bartonella quintana
  – Beijerinckiaceae
  – Nitrobacteraceae
  – Afipia
  – Bradyrhizobium
  – Nitrobacter
  – Rhodopseudomonas
  – Brucellaceae
  – Brucella
  – Brucella abortus
  – Brucella canis
  – Brucella melitensis
  – Brucella ovis
  – Brucella suis
  – Ochrobactrum
  – Ochrobactrum anthropi
  – Caulobacteraceae
  – Caulobacter
  – Caulobacter crescentus
  – Holosporaceae
  – hyphomicrobiaceae
  – Azorhizobium
  – Azorhizobium caulinodans
  – Hyphomicrobium
  – Rhodomicrobium
  – Xanthobacter
  – methylobacteriaceae
  – Methylobacterium
  – Methylobacterium extorquens
  – Methylocystaceae
  – Methylosinus
  – Methylosinus trichosporium
  – Rhodospirillales
  – acetobacteraceae
  – Acetobacter
  – Acidiphilium
  – Gluconacetobacter
  – Gluconacetobacter xylinus
  – Gluconobacter
  – Gluconobacter oxydans
  – Rhodospirillaceae
  – Azospirillum
  – Azospirillum brasilense
  – Azospirillum lipoferum
  – Magnetospirillum
  – Rhodospirillum
  – Rhodospirillum centenum
  – Rhodospirillum rubrum
  – rhizobiaceae
  – Rhizobium
  – Rhizobium etli
  – Rhizobium leguminosarum
  – Rhizobium phaseoli
  – Rhizobium radiobacter
  – Rhizobium tropici
  – Sinorhizobium
  – Sinorhizobium fredii
  – Sinorhizobium meliloti
  – Rhodobacteraceae
  – Paracoccus
  – Paracoccus denitrificans
  – Paracoccus pantotrophus
  – Rhodobacter
  – Rhodobacter capsulatus
  – Rhodobacter sphaeroides
  – Rhodovulum
  – Roseobacter
  – rickettsiaceae
  – rickettsieae
  – Orientia tsutsugamushi
  – Rickettsia
  – Rickettsia akari
  – Rickettsia conorii
  – Rickettsia felis
  – Rickettsia prowazekii
  – Rickettsia rickettsii
  – Rickettsia typhi
  – Wolbachia
  – sphingomonadaceae
  – Sphingomonas
  – Zymomonas

– Betaproteobacteria
  – alcaligenaceae
  – Achromobacter
  – Achromobacter cycloclastes
  – Achromobacter denitrificans
  – Alcaligenes
  – Alcaligenes faecalis
  – Bordetella
  – Bordetella avium
  – Bordetella bronchiseptica
  – Bordetella parapertussis
  – Bordetella pertussis
  – Taylorella
  – Taylorella equigenitalis
  – burkholderiaceae
  – Burkholderia
  – Burkholderia cepacia complex
  – Burkholderia cepacia
  – Burkholderia gladioli
  – Burkholderia mallei
  – Burkholderia pseudomallei
  – comamonadaceae
  – Comamonas
  – Comamonas testosteroni
  – Delftia
  – Delftia acidovorans
  – Leptothrix
  – Sphaerotilus
  – gallionellaceae
  – hydrogenophilaceae
  – Thiobacillus
  – methylophilaceae
  – Methylobacillus
  – Methylophilus
  – Methylophilus methylotrophus
  – neisseriaceae
  – Chromobacterium
  – Eikenella
  – Eikenella corrodens
  – Kingella
  – Kingella kingae
  – Neisseria
  – Neisseria  cinerea
  – Neisseria  elongata
  – Neisseria  gonorrhoeae
  – Neisseria  lactamica
  – Neisseria  meningitidis
  – Neisseria  meningitidis, serogroup A
  – Neisseria  meningitidis, serogroup B
  – Neisseria  meningitidis, serogroup C
  – Neisseria  meningitidis, serogroup W-135
  – Neisseria  meningitidis, serogroup Y
  – Neisseria mucosa
  – Neisseria  sicca
  – Vitreoscilla
  – nitrosomonadaceae
  – Nitrosomonas
  – Nitrosomonas europaea
  – oxalobacteraceae
  – Herbaspirillum
  – Oxalobacter formigenes
  – ralstoniaceae
  – Ralstonia
  – Ralstonia pickettii
  – Ralstonia solanacearum
  – Wautersia
  – Wautersia eutropha
  – rhodocyclaceae
  – Azoarcus
  – Thauera
  – Zoogloea
  – Spirillaceae
  – Spirillum

– Deltaproteobacteria
NOTE: The class Deltaproteobacteria has been dismantled and its members have been assigned to new phyla (indicated in parentheses).
  – Bdellovibrio (Bdellovibrionota)
  – Bilophila (Thermodesulfobacteriota)
  – Desulfovibrio (Thermodesulfobacteriota)
  – Desulfovibrio africanus
  – Desulfovibrio desulfuricans
  – Desulfovibrio gigas
  – Desulfovibrio vulgaris
  – Desulfuromonas (Thermodesulfobacteriota)
  – Geobacter (Thermodesulfobacteriota)
  – Lawsonia bacteria (Thermodesulfobacteriota)
  – myxococcales (Myxococcota)
  – Myxococcus
  – Myxococcus xanthus
  – Stigmatella
  – Stigmatella aurantiaca

– Campylobacterota
  – Arcobacter
  – Campylobacter
  – Campylobacter coli
  – Campylobacter fetus
  – Campylobacter hyointestinalis
  – Campylobacter jejuni
  – Campylobacter lari
  – Campylobacter rectus
  – Campylobacter sputorum
  – Campylobacter upsaliensis
  – Gastrospirillum
  – Helicobacter
  – Helicobacter felis
  – Helicobacter heilmannii
  – Helicobacter hepaticus
  – Helicobacter mustelae
  – Helicobacter pylori
  – Wolinella

– gammaproteobacteria
  – Acidithiobacillus
  – Acidithiobacillus thiooxidans
  – aeromonadaceae
  – Aeromonas
  – Aeromonas hydrophila
  – Aeromonas salmonicida
  – alteromonadaceae
  – Alteromonas
  – Moritella
  – Pseudoalteromonas
  – Shewanella
  – Shewanella putrefaciens
  – Buchnera
  – cardiobacteriaceae
  – Cardiobacterium
  – Dichelobacter nodosus
  – chromatiaceae
  – Chromatium
  – Halothiobacillus
  – Thiocapsa
  – Thiocapsa roseopersicina
  – coxiellaceae
  – Coxiella
  – Coxiella burnetii
  – ectothiorhodospiraceae
  – Ectothiorhodospira
  – Ectothiorhodospira shaposhnikovii
  – Halorhodospira halophila
  – enterobacteriaceae
  – Calymmatobacterium
  – Citrobacter
  – Citrobacter freundii
  – Citrobacter koseri
  – Citrobacter rodentium
  – Edwardsiella
  – Edwardsiella ictaluri
  – Edwardsiella tarda
  – Enterobacter
  – Enterobacter aerogenes
  – Enterobacter cloacae
  – Enterobacter sakazakii
  – Erwinia
  – Erwinia amylovora
  – Escherichia
  – Escherichia coli
  – Escherichia coli k12
  – Escherichia coli o157
  – Hafnia
  – Hafnia alvei
  – Klebsiella
  – Klebsiella oxytoca
  – Klebsiella pneumoniae
  – Kluyvera
  – Morganella
  – Morganella morganii
  – Pantoea
  – Pectobacterium
  – Pectobacterium carotovorum
  – Pectobacterium chrysanthemi
  – Photorhabdus
  – Plesiomonas
  – Proteus
  – Proteus mirabilis
  – Proteus penneri
  – Proteus vulgaris
  – Providencia
  – Rahnella
  – Salmonella
  – Salmonella arizonae
  – Salmonella enterica
  – Salmonella enteritidis
  – Salmonella paratyphi A
  – Salmonella paratyphi B
  – Salmonella paratyphi C
  – Salmonella typhi
  – Salmonella typhimurium
  – Serratia
  – Serratia liquefaciens
  – Serratia marcescens
  – Shigella
  – Shigella boydii
  – Shigella dysenteriae
  – Shigella flexneri
  – Shigella sonnei
  – Wigglesworthia
  – Xenorhabdus
  – Yersinia
  – Yersinia enterocolitica
  – Yersinia pestis
  – Yersinia pseudotuberculosis
  – Yersinia rucker
  – Francisella
  – Francisella tularensis
  – halomonadaceae
  – Halomonas
  – legionellaceae
  – Legionella
  – Legionella longbeachae
  – Legionella pneumophila
  – methylococcaceae
  – Methylococcus
  – Methylococcus capsulatus
  – Methylomonas
  – moraxellaceae
  – Acinetobacter
  – Acinetobacter baumannii
  – Acinetobacter calcoaceticus
  – Moraxella
  – Moraxella (Branhamella) catarrhalis
  – Moraxella (Moraxella) bovis
  – Psychrobacter
  – oceanospirillaceae
  – pasteurellaceae
  – Actinobacillus
  – Actinobacillus actinomycetemcomitans
  – Actinobacillus equuli
  – Actinobacillus pleuropneumoniae
  – Actinobacillus seminis
  – Actinobacillus suis
  – Haemophilus
  – Haemophilus ducreyi
  – Haemophilus influenzae
  – Haemophilus influenzae type B
  – Haemophilus paragallinarum
  – Haemophilus parainfluenzae
  – Haemophilus paraphrophilus
  – Haemophilus parasuis
  – Haemophilus somnus
  – Mannheimia
  – Mannheimia haemolytica
  – Pasteurella
  – Pasteurella multocida
  – Pasteurella pneumotropica
  – piscirickettsiaceae
  – pseudomonadaceae
  – azotobacteraceae
  – Azotobacter
  – Azotobacter vinelandii
  – Cellvibrio
  – Pseudomonas
  – Pseudomonas aeruginosa
  – Pseudomonas alcaligenes
  – Pseudomonas fluorescens
  – Pseudomonas fragi
  – Pseudomonas mendocina
  – Pseudomonas oleovorans
  – Pseudomonas pseudoalcaligenes
  – Pseudomonas putida
  – Pseudomonas stutzeri
  – Pseudomonas syringae
  – succinivibrionaceae
  – Anaerobiospirillum
  – thiotrichaceae
  – vibrionaceae
  – Photobacterium
  – Vibrio
  – Vibrio alginolyticus
  – Vibrio cholerae
  – Vibrio cholerae non-O1
  – Vibrio cholerae O1
  – Vibrio cholerae O139
  – Vibrio fischeri
  – Vibrio mimicus
  – Vibrio parahaemolyticus
  – Vibrio salmonicida
  – Vibrio vulnificus
  – xanthomonadaceae
  – Stenotrophomonas
  – Stenotrophomonas maltophilia
  – Xanthomonas
  – Xanthomonas campestris
  – Xanthomonas vesicatoria
  – Xylella

– spirochaetales

– leptospiraceae
  – Leptospira
  – Leptospira interrogans
  – Leptospira interrogans serovar australis
  – Leptospira interrogans serovar autumnalis
  – Leptospira interrogans serovar anicola
  – Leptospira interrogans serovar hebdomadis
  – Leptospira interrogans serovar icterohaemorrhagiae
  – Leptospira interrogans serovar pomona

– spirochaetaceae
  – Borrelia
  – Borrelia burgdorferi group
  – Borrelia burgdorferi
  – Serpulina
  – Serpulina hyodysenteriae
  – Spirochaeta
  – Treponema
  – Treponema denticola
  – Treponema pallidum

– spores

– spores, bacterial

– sulfur-reducing bacteria

– Desulfitobacterium

– Desulfotomaculum

– Desulfovibrio
  – Desulfovibrio africanus
  – Desulfovibrio desulfuricans
  – Desulfovibrio gigas
  – Desulfovibrio vulgaris

– Desulfuromonas

The list continues at List of MeSH codes (B04).

B03